Open House is an album by American jazz organist Jimmy Smith featuring performances recorded in 1960, but not released on the Blue Note label until 1968. The album didn't appear on CD until being reissued in 1992, as a twofer which also included Plain Talk, compiling all the recordings from the session.

Reception
The Allmusic review by Michael Erlewine awarded the album 4 stars calling it "a fast-paced studio jam session".

Track listing
 "Open House" (Jimmy Smith) – 16:15
 "Old Folks" (Willard Robison, Dedette Lee Hill) – 4:49
 "Sista Rebecca" (Smith) – 10:54
 "Embraceable You" (Gershwin, Gershwin) – 6:05

Personnel

Musicians
 Jimmy Smith – organ
 Quentin Warren – guitar
 Donald Bailey – drums

Additional musicians
 Blue Mitchell – trumpet (tracks 1, 3)
 Jackie McLean – alto saxophone (tracks 1, 3, 4; feature track 4)
 Ike Quebec – tenor saxophone (tracks 1, 2, 3; feature track 2)

Technical
 Alfred Lion – producer
 Rudy Van Gelder – engineer
 Reid Miles – design
 Francis Wolff – photography
 Leonard Feather – liner notes

References

Blue Note Records albums
Jimmy Smith (musician) albums
1968 albums
Albums recorded at Van Gelder Studio
Albums produced by Alfred Lion